Store Lauvhøi or Lauvhøe is a mountain in Lom Municipality in Innlandet county, Norway. The mountain is surrounded by several other notable mountains including Eisteinhovde to the northeast, Kvitingskjølen to the east, Finnshalspiggen and Nørdre Trollsteinhøe to the southeast, Galdhøpiggen to the southwest, and Storhøi to the west.

See also
List of mountains of Norway

References

Lom, Norway
Mountains of Innlandet